Catophoenissa is a genus of moths in the family Geometridae.

Species
 Catophoenissa baynei (Prout, 1910)
 Catophoenissa costiplaga (Prout, 1910)
 Catophoenissa dibapha (Felder & Rogenhofer, 1875)

References
 Catophoenissa at Markku Savela's Lepidoptera and Some Other Life Forms
 Natural History Museum Lepidoptera genus database

Ennominae